The Senegal women's national under-16 basketball team is a national basketball team of Senegal, administered by the Fédération Sénégalaise de Basket-Ball.
It represents the country in international under-16 (under age 16) women's basketball competitions.

See also
Senegal women's national basketball team
Senegal women's national under-19 basketball team
Senegal men's national under-16 basketball team

References

External links
Archived records of Senegal team participations

Under
Women's national under-16 basketball teams